This protein family consists of various potassium transport proteins (Trk) and V-type sodium ATP synthase subunit J or translocating ATPase J (EC). These proteins are involved in active sodium uptake utilizing ATP in the process. TrkH from Escherichia coli is a transmembrane protein and determines the specificity and kinetics of cation transport by the TrK system in this organism. This protein interacts with TrkA and requires TrkE for transport activity.

References

Transmembrane transporters
Protein families